Tsengel Hairhan (lit. "delight holy mountain") is a mountain of the Altai Mountains and located in the Bayan-Ölgii Province in Mongolia. It has elevation of 3,943 m (12,841 ft) and the one of 13 high mountains with glaciers in Mongol-Altai mountain range.

References 

Mountains of Mongolia
Altai Mountains
Bayan-Ölgii Province